Jörg Münzner (born 14 July 1960) is an Austrian equestrian and Olympic medalist. He was born in Hamburg. He won a silver medal in show jumping at the 1992 Summer Olympics in Barcelona.

References

1960 births
Living people
Austrian male equestrians
Olympic equestrians of Austria
Olympic silver medalists for Austria
Equestrians at the 1992 Summer Olympics
Sportspeople from Hamburg
Olympic medalists in equestrian
Medalists at the 1992 Summer Olympics